"At the Ballet" is a song from the musical A Chorus Line.

Production
Changed for Good: A Feminist History of the Broadway Musical noted:

Synopsis
The dancers explain their experiences with attending dance school, as well as family-related trauma. No matter how dark the rest of their world seems, they always feel happy and engaged "at the ballet".

Musicals101 explains "At the Ballet" as a "poignant tribute to the escape Sheila, Bebe, and Maggie found in the beauty of ballet."

Analysis
Changed for Good: A Feminist History of the Broadway Musical explains: "Sheila, Bebe, and Maggie sing the same wistful melody; then their harmonies grow and build, one layering on the other".

Critical reception
AussieTheatre.com described it as a "poignant song".

References

Songs about dancing
Songs about theatre
Songs from A Chorus Line
Songs written by Marvin Hamlisch
1975 songs